Enguerrand (also Ingram, died 1174) was a twelfth-century bishop of Glasgow. He had previously been Archdeacon of Teviotdale, and had served king Máel Coluim IV as Chancellor of Scotland between 1161 and 1164. He was elected Bishop of Glasgow on Sunday, 20 September 1164, and consecrated on 28 October at the hands of Pope Alexander III himself in Sens, France, where the Pope was then resident. He did not return to the diocese until 2 June 1165. Although he resigned the position of Royal Chancellor upon election to the bishopric, there is charter evidence that he once again became Chancellor in the reign of King William the Lion, probably in the year 1171. Notable actions of his episcopate included, probably on the request of his friend (and successor) Jocelin, then Abbot of Melrose, the opening of the tomb of the emerging saint Walthoef. He died on 2 February 1174.

Notes

References
Anderson, Alan Orr, Early Sources of Scottish History: AD 500–1286, 2 Vols, (Edinburgh, 1922), vol. ii
Dowden, John, The Bishops of Scotland, ed. J. Maitland Thomson, (Glasgow, 1912)
Fawcetts, Richard, & Oram, Richard, Melrose Abbey, (Stroud, 2004)

Bishops of Glasgow
Lord chancellors of Scotland
12th-century births
1174 deaths
12th-century Scottish Roman Catholic bishops